Skyler Dale Page (born October 13, 1989) is an American animator, writer, storyboard artist, and voice actor. He is best known as the creator of the Cartoon Network animated series Clarence, as well as for his tenure as a writer and storyboard artist on the series Adventure Time.

Early life
Page was born in Phoenix, Arizona on October 13, 1989.

Career
Page is a graduate of California Institute of the Arts. He created two short films entitled Crater Face and Girl Wallet. He then became a writer and storyboard artist and revisionist for Cartoon Network's series Adventure Time and Secret Mountain Fort Awesome. Page is the creator of the show Clarence, where he also voiced the eponymous character. The idea for the series was conceived by Page, along with creative director Nelson Boles, while they were still students at CalArts. The concept was put into further consideration upon Page landing a job at the studio. The series' pilot episode earned Page a nomination for a Creative Arts Emmy Award at the 65th Primetime Creative Arts Emmy Awards ceremony, hosted on September 15, 2013.

In June 2014, Emily Partridge, a storyboard artist on Adventure Time that had worked with Page, made a series of tweets alleging that he had sexually assaulted her. This was after rumors had surfaced on Twitter claiming that Page was "known to grope women without their consent." Page was fired from Clarence in July, and days after his firing, Jeff Rowe stated in a Tumblr post that Page had bipolar I and claimed he had been suffering a manic episode. Emily Quinn, production coordinator on Adventure Time, corroborated the claims about Page's illness, but said that it was not an excuse for his behavior. Spencer Rothbell, one of the writers on Clarence, began to voice Page's character for the remainder of the series.

On June 21, 2021, Page spoke publicly for the first time on the allegations and issued an apology. He stated in a blog post he "was on a power trip from 2012 to 2015" and admitted that he had been "inappropriate towards women". Page ended the post by saying, "Should I be fortunate enough to work alongside you good folks once again you can be sure to expect the utmost respect and dignity out of me."

Filmography

References

External links

Skylerdalepage.com

1989 births
Living people
American animators
American animated film directors
American male voice actors
California Institute of the Arts alumni
People with bipolar disorder
Adventure Time
Cartoon Network Studios people